F1 2015 is a racing game based on the 2015 Formula One season developed by Codemasters. It was released in July 2015, and features the team and driver line-ups from the 2015 season, including the Autódromo Hermanos Rodríguez. It also features all the drivers, cars and circuits from the 2014 season (i.e. Caterham F1, and the Hockenheimring, which was removed from the calendar). It is the last game from Codemasters branded under the Codemasters Racing label and first title in the F1 series released for eighth generation consoles.

Gameplay
As the F1 series makes its debut on PlayStation 4 and Xbox One, the game runs on an all-new version of the EGO game engine, providing a large number of improvements to the game's physics models. It features an all-new "Pro Season" mode that is more challenging than the normal gameplay because there is no HUD and no assist, which includes traction, ABS, and transmission, with the hardest level possible.

The game is also compatible with the PlayStation 4 and Xbox One's voice recognition software, allowing players to talk to their race engineers during the race and ask for race information, weather updates, and tyre status, and even request a change of tyres or wing.

The game was also noted for the fact that the AI would often wreck or make mistakes. This drew both praise and criticism from game critics.

Development and release
Unlike previous Codemasters F1 games, which were released in September–October, F1 2015 was released in July 2015, with the previous title F1 2014 serving as more of a "filler" game until the 2015 title was released. The game was made using a new game engine to dramatically improve both the screen quality and the AI's abilities.

F1 2015 was released worldwide for Microsoft Windows and in Europe for PlayStation 4 and Xbox One on 10 July 2015, followed by a North American console release on 21 July 2015. A version for Linux developed and published by Feral Interactive was released on 26 May 2016.

Reception

The final product received a mixed reception with the PlayStation 4 version scoring 65 out of 100 on the review aggregator site Metacritic and 65.02% on GameRankings. IGN rated the game a 5.8/10, praising the graphics and control system, but criticising the severe lack of game modes and overly aggressive AI. Metro liked the weather effects, and said the game held its own in the genre.

The version released for PC received more mixed reception after release, scoring 61 of 100 from critics according to review aggregator Metacritic.  Reviews on GameRankings yielded a rating of 58.17%.

The game ascended to number one in the Chart-Track sales chart.

References

External links

Codemasters website

2015 video games
Codemasters games
Bandai Namco games
Ego (game engine) games
F1 (video game series)
Linux games
PlayStation 4 games
Racing video games
Ubisoft games
Video games scored by Mark Knight
Video games set in Australia
Video games set in Malaysia
Video games set in Bahrain
Video games set in China
Video games set in Spain
Video games set in Monaco
Video games set in Canada
Video games set in Austria
Video games set in the United Kingdom
Video games set in Hungary
Video games set in Belgium
Video games set in Italy
Video games set in Singapore
Video games set in Japan
Video games set in Russia
Video games set in Texas
Video games set in Mexico
Video games set in Brazil
Video games set in the United Arab Emirates
Windows games
Xbox One games
Multiplayer and single-player video games
Video games developed in the United Kingdom
Feral Interactive games